Elks Lodge No. 607 is a historic building in Idaho Springs, Colorado. It was built in 1907.

Before the site was the Elks Lodge, it was the Beebe House Hotel. President Ulysses S. Grant stayed there in 1873.

References

Elks buildings
Buildings and structures completed in 1907
Clubhouses in Colorado